Safran S.A. is a French multinational company that designs, develops and manufactures aircraft engines, rocket engines as well as various aerospace and defense-related equipment or their components. It was formed by a merger between SNECMA and the defense electronics specialist SAGEM in 2005. Safran's acquisition of Zodiac Aerospace in 2018 significantly expanded its aeronautical activities.

Employing over 95,000 people and generating 24.64 billion euros in sales in 2019, the company is listed on the Euronext stock exchange and is part of the CAC 40 and Euro Stoxx 50. Its headquarters are located in Paris.

Name
The name Safran was chosen from 4,250 suggestions, including 1,750 proposed by employees. As a holding company for many subsidiaries, the name was deemed suitable for the suggestion of direction, movement, and strategy. Safran translates as rudder blade and as saffron, which the company highlights as one of the catalysts for early international trade.

History

Origins
In 1905 Louis Seguin created the company Gnome. Production of the first rotary engine for airplanes, the Gnome Omega, started in 1909. This company merged with the Le Rhône, a company created in 1912 by Louis Verdet, to form the Gnome et Rhône engine company. Gnome & Rhône was nationalized in 1945, creating Snecma. In 2000, this company gave its name to the “Snecma Group”, and carried out a number of acquisitions to form a larger group with an array of complementary businesses.

Sagem (Société d’Applications Générales de l’Electricité et de la Mécanique) was created in 1925 by Marcel Môme. In 1939, Sagem entered the telephone and transmissions market by taking control of Société anonyme des télécommunications (SAT). It acquired Société de Fabrication d’Instruments de Mesure (Sfim), a measurement instrument specialist, in 1999.  However, by 2008 Sagem Mobile and Sagem Communications had been sold.   Sagem Mobile became Sagem Wireless in January 2009.

Safran Group 
The Safran Group was created on 11 May 2005 with the merger of Snecma and Sagem SA.

In June 2014, Arianespace CEO Stephane Israel announced that European efforts to remain competitive in response to SpaceX's recent success have begun in earnest.  This included the creation of a new joint venture company from Arianespace's two largest shareholders:  the launch-vehicle producer Airbus and engine-producer Safran.

By May 2015, Safran had created with Airbus Group a launcher joint venture called Airbus Safran Launchers.
This entity is currently developing the Ariane 6 launch vehicle for initial flights in the 2020s.

In January 2017, Safran initiated a takeover of the aircraft interior supplier Zodiac Aerospace to create the third largest aerospace supplier with $22.5 billion revenue, behind United Technologies with $28.2 billion and GE Aviation with $24.7 billion; the new group will be 92,000-employee strong, with 48% of its business in aircraft systems and equipment, from landing gears to seats, 46% in propulsion and 6% in defense.

In May 2017, Safran announced the completion of the sale of its identity and security activities to Advent International for Euro 2.4 billion.

In February 2018, Safran took control of Zodiac Aerospace, significantly expanding its aircraft equipment activities. Zodiac Aerospace has 32,500 employees and generated sales of 5.1 billion euros for its fiscal year ended 31 August 2017.

On 4 June 2018 Boeing and Safran announced their 50-50 partnership to design, build and service Auxiliary Power Units after regulatory and antitrust clearance in the second half of 2018.
This could threaten the dominance of Honeywell and United Technologies.

Group organization

The Safran group is divided into three main branches:

Aerospace Propulsion

The aerospace propulsion branch groups all operations concerning the propulsion of aeroplanes, helicopters, missiles, and launchers, for the civil aviation, military aviation, and space markets: design, production, marketing, testing, maintenance, repair, and overhaul (MRO).

Safran Aircraft Engines (formerly Snecma Moteurs)
Commercial & military engines, liquid propulsion for space launchers
Safran Helicopter Engines
Turboshaft engines for helicopters
Jet engines for training and support aircraft
Turbines for missiles and drones (Microturbo subsidiary)
APU (Microturbo subsidiary). Safran provides APU systems since 1962.
 Safran Microturbo
Safran Aero Boosters
Components for aircraft and rocket engines
Safran Transmission Systems
Power transmissions for aircraft engines
ArianeGroup
Solid rocket motors for launchers, strategic and tactical missiles
Thermostructural composite materials
 
Flight-testing may happen in 2019 or 2020.

Other subsidiaries
Safran Test Cells, Inc.
Smartec
SMA Engines
Snecma Services Brussels
Snecma Suzhou
Snecma Xinyi Airfoil Castings

Aircraft Equipment, Defense and Aerosystems

The aircraft equipment branch groups all design, production, sales, and support operations for systems and equipment used by civil and military airplanes and helicopters.

Safran Landing Systems
Landing gear design, manufacture, and support
Wheels and carbon brakes for mainline commercial jets
Braking control and hydraulic systems
Safran Nacelles
Commercial airplane engine nacelles and thrust reversers
Safran Electrical & Power
Aircraft wiring and power distribution
Safran Electronics & Defense
Technologies and services in optronics, avionics, electronics and safety-critical software  
Safran Aerosystems
Equipment and systems in fluid management and security 
Safran Engineering Services
Engineering and consulting company

Other subsidiaries

Globe Motors
SLCA
Sofrance
Technofan Inc.
OEMServices
 Sagem Avionics
 Vectronix
 IdentoGO

Aircraft Interiors
 
Safran Cabin
Cabin interiors 
Safran Seats
Passenger and technical seats
Safran Passenger Solutions
Cabin equipment and solutions focused on passenger comfort

Corporate affairs

Shareholder profile

 Public: 81.3%
 French state: 11.2%
 Employees: 7.4%
 Treasury shares: 0.1%

See also

Musée aéronautique et spatial Safran - Museum managed by Safran containing French heritage aircraft engines
List of aircraft engine manufacturers

References

External links

Safran Group
Aerospace companies of France
Manufacturing companies established in 2005
Defence companies of France
French companies established in 2005
French brands
CAC 40
Companies listed on Euronext Paris
Multinational companies headquartered in France
Companies in the Euro Stoxx 50
Government-owned companies of France